World Champion is a 1954 Soviet sport drama film directed by Vladimir Gonchukov.

Plot 
Ilya Gromov is a well-known strongman among fellow villagers. Under the guidance of an experienced coach, a simple country boy becomes a world champion in the Greco-Roman wrestling.

Cast
 Aleksey Vanin as Ilya Gromov, wrestler
 Vladimir Volodin as Privalov
 Vasily Merkuryev as Fyodor Bessonov
 Vladimir Gulyaev 
 Denis Andreyev
 Veniamin Beloglazov
 Nadezhda Cherednichenko
 Dmitriy Kara-Dmitriev
 Klavdiya Khabarova
 Nikolai Komissarov
 Muza Krepkogorskaya

Release 
Vladimir Gonchukov film's took the 12th place in the ranking of the highest-grossing films of the USSR in 1955. In the history of Soviet hire, he is on the 461st place with 27.9 million spectators.

References

External links 
 

1954 films
1950s sports drama films
1950s Russian-language films
Soviet sports drama films
Gorky Film Studio films
Soviet black-and-white films
1954 drama films